Joshna is an Indian feminine given name. Notable people with the name include:

 Joshna Chinappa (born 1986), Indian squash player
 Joshna Fernando (born 1991), Indian actress and model

See also
 Joshua (name)

Indian feminine given names